The Premio 40 Principales América for Best Dominican Act is an honor presented annually since 2014 as part of Los Premios 40 Principales América.

Winners and nominees

References

Awards established in 2014
Latin American music awards
2014 establishments in the Dominican Republic